Pachwad, Panchwad or Kasabe Panchwad is a village in Wai taluka, Satara district, Maharashtra, India. It is situated on the bank of the Krishna river. The Indian National Highway (NH4) passes through the village.
Pachwad is a market place for surrounding villages.
Pachwad is famous for weekly market of vegetables.

Famous for weekly Bazar of livestock animals. 
Schools:Zilla parishad primary school, Mahatma Gandhi Vidyalaya., Y.C.Senior college.
Temples: Navalai Devi, 
Population:near about 4500

There is another Pachwad village in khatav Taluka of Satara district.

Villages in Satara district